Dominique Mulliez (1952, Roubaix), is a French epigrapher and Hellenist, head of the French School at Athens from 2002 to September 2011.

Biography 
After he was admitted at the École normale supérieure in 1974, he obtained an agrégation in classical letters, then became a member of the French School in Athens from 1979 to 1984. He specialized in Greek epigraphy and got a State doctorate in 1994 with a thesis (unpublished) entitled Recherches sur les actes d'affranchissement delphiques. He also directed the excavations of the Agora of Thasos.

In 1998, he founded the HALMA team (History, Archaeology, Literature of Ancient Worlds). In 2002, he was appointed director of the French School of Athens, a function he exercised until 2011. He then held the civilization and Greek iconography Chair at the University Paris-IV Sorbonne, where he taught in particular the history of Greek religion.

Dominique Mulliez is a correspondent member of the Académie des inscriptions et belles-lettres. He was made a Chevalier of the Légion d'honneur July 14, 2010.

External links 
 Dominique Mulliez on data.bnf.fr
 Dominique Mulliez on Savoir ENS
 Thesis by D. Mulliez on Theses.fr
 Agora des savoirs - Dominique Mulliez (video) 

French hellenists
French epigraphers
French archaeologists
20th-century French historians
École Normale Supérieure alumni
Members of the French School at Athens
Corresponding members of the Académie des Inscriptions et Belles-Lettres
Chevaliers of the Légion d'honneur
People from Roubaix
1952 births
Living people